Wilson Champramary is an Indian Politician from the state of West Bengal. He is a two term member of the West Bengal Legislative Assembly representing the Kalchini.

He represents the Kalchini constituency. He won the Assembly Election 2016 as a member of All India Trinamool Congress in which he defeated his nearest rival Bishal Lama of BJP.

In 2009, he won a by election after the preceding MLA Manohar Tirkey won the Lok Sabha election from Alipurudars as an independent supported by the Gorkha Janmukti Morcha. In 2016 he joined All India Trinamool Congress, but later switched to BJP after the 2019 Lok Sabha elections.

References 

West Bengal MLAs 2011–2016
West Bengal MLAs 2016–2021
Living people
Trinamool Congress politicians from West Bengal
Year of birth missing (living people)
People from Alipurduar district
Bharatiya Janata Party politicians from West Bengal